This is a list of political parties in Italy since Italian unification in 1861.

Throughout history, numerous political parties have been operating in Italy, and since World War II no party has ever gained enough support to govern alone: parties thus form political alliances and coalition governments.

In the 2022 general election four groupings obtained most of the votes and most of the seats in the two houses of the Italian Parliament: the "centre-right coalition" composed of the Brothers of Italy, Lega, Forza Italia and minor allies; the "centre-left coalition" composed of the Democratic Party and minor allies; the populist Five Star Movement; and the liberal Action – Italia Viva.

Coalitions of parties for regional elections can be slightly different from those for general elections, due to different regional conditions (for instance, in some regions the Five Star Movement and the Democratic Party are in coalition, but not in others; same for Action – Italia Viva and the Democratic Party) and the presence of several regional parties, some of which active only at regional level.

History
The first modern political party in Italy was the Italian Socialist Party, established in 1892. Until then, the main political groupings of the country, the Historical Right and the Historical Left, were not classifiable as parties, but as simple groups of notables, each with their own electoral fiefdom, that joined together according to their own ideas. From time to time, in the context of the Historical Far Left, other parties emerged: the Italian Republican Party, established in 1895, and the Italian Radical Party, established in 1904.

The Italian Socialist Party envisaged itself as a mass party, a form of party that would dominate throughout the 20th century. It was followed a few years later by the Italian People's Party, established in 1919. Both parties achieved electoral success until the advent of fascism, contributing decisively to the loss of strength and authority of the old liberal ruling class, which had not been able to structure itself into a proper party: the Liberal Union, launched in 1913, was not a coherent one and the Italian Liberal Party, formed in 1922, came too late. The beginning of 1921 saw the foundation of the Communist Party of Italy (later Italian Communist Party), born from a split of the Italian Socialist Party. Also in 1921, Benito Mussolini gave birth to the National Fascist Party, and the next year, through the March on Rome, he was appointed Prime Minister. In 1926, through the so-called leggi fascistissime, all parties were dissolved except the National Fascist Party, which thus remained the only legal party in the Kingdom of Italy until the fall of the regime in July 1943. The following September, six anti-fascist parties — the Christian Democracy, the Italian Socialist Party, the Italian Communist Party, the Italian Liberal Party, the Action Party and the Labour Democratic Party — formed the joint National Liberation Committee, which gained official recognition as the representative of the Italian resistance movement (the Committee recognised the monarchy, thus the Italian Republican Party stayed out because of its full loyalty to republican principles). The parties of the Committee then formed, in various combinations, the governments of Italy from the liberation of Rome in 1944 until 1947, when the Socialists and the Communists were ejected. In 1946, through a referendum, Italy became a republic and a Constituent Assembly wrote the republican Constitution.

Between 1948 and 1992, the party system was dominated by two major parties: the Christian Democracy, the largest and the structural party of government, and the Italian Communist Party, the main opposition party. Another stable opposition party was the post-fascist Italian Social Movement. For about half a century, following a so-called conventio ad excludendum of the Italian Communist Party, the governments were led by the Christian Democracy, that chose its coalition partners among smaller parties situated either to its left or right: the Italian Socialist Party, the Italian Democratic Socialist Party, the Italian Liberal Party and the Italian Republican Party. Between 1981 and 1991, the Christian Democrats formed coalition governments named Pentapartito with all four of them. That was the time when several northern regional parties, whose policy themes were federalism and autonomism, were established locally. In 1991 they federated themselves into Lega Nord, which became the country's fourth largest party in the 1992 general election.

In 1992–94, the post-war, established party system was shaken by a series of corruption scandals known collectively as Tangentopoli. These events led to the disappearance of the five parties of government. Consequently, the Italian Communist Party, which had evolved to become the Democratic Party of the Left in 1991, with the exit of the Communist Refoundation Party, and the post-fascists, who had launched National Alliance in 1994, gained strength. Following the 1994 general election, media tycoon Silvio Berlusconi became Prime Minister at the head of a government composed mainly of his brand-new Forza Italia party, joined by several members of the defunct mainstream parties, National Alliance and Lega Nord.

Between 1996 and 2008, the political parties were organised into two big coalitions, the centre-right Pole for Freedoms, which was renamed House of Freedoms after the re-entry of Lega Nord in 2000, and The Olive Tree, lately part of a broader coalition named The Union, on the centre-left. The latter governed from 1996 to 2001 and again between 2006 and 2008, while the centre-right was in government between 2001 and 2006. In 2008, following the fall of the centre-left government led by Romano Prodi, the Democratic Party (established in 2007 upon the merger of the Democrats of the Left and Democracy is Freedom – The Daisy) decided to break the alliance with the Communist Refoundation Party and other minor left-wing parties. Contextually, on the right of the political spectrum, Forza Italia and National Alliance merged to form The People of Freedom, which continued the alliance with Lega Nord and prevailed in the 2008 general election.

In the 2013 general election the party system was fragmented in four groupings: the centre-left alliance led by the Democratic Party; the traditional centre-right alliance between the People of Freedom, Lega Nord and the newly-founded Brothers of Italy (a right-wing split of the People of Freedom, formed mainly by former members of National Alliance); Beppe Grillo's Five Star Movement; and a new centrist coalition around the outgoing Prime Minister Mario Monti's Civic Choice party. In November 2013, the national council of People of Freedom, at the behest of Berlusconi, suspended all party activities, in order to relaunch Forza Italia, which would experience multiple splits. In the 2018 general election the major groupings were reduced to three: the centre-right coalition, composed of Lega (Lega Nord's evolution on a countrywide scale), Forza Italia, Brothers of Italy and minor allies; the Five Star Movement (which was the single most voted party); and the centre-left coalition, composed of the Democratic party and minor allies. The centre-right coalition won a full majority in the 2022 general election, leading to a government led by Brothers of Italy's leader Giorgia Meloni (the first since 2008 to be formed by a coalition of parties having fought the election together), while the opposition was fragmented in three segments: the Democratic Party-led centre-left coalition; the Five Star Movement; and a centrist alliance between Action and Italia Viva.

Active parties

Parties represented in the Italian or European Parliament 

Notes

Parties represented only in Regional Councils

Non-represented parties

Countrywide parties

Regional parties

Overseas parties 
South American Union of Italian Emigrants (est. 2006)

Defunct parties

Defunct parties represented in the Italian or European Parliament

Countrywide parties

Regional parties

Overseas parties 
Independent Alternative for Italians Abroad (2005–c.2006)
For Italy in the World (2006)
Italian Associations in South America (2005–c.2008)

Defunct parties represented only in Regional Councils 

Notes

Defunct non-represented parties 

Notes

See also
List of political coalitions in Italy
List of parliamentary groups in Italy
List of political parties by region
Table of political parties in Europe by pancontinental organisation

References 

Italy
 
Italy